Ali Naseer Mohamed (born 2 November 1969) is a Maldivian diplomat who was Permanent Representative of the Maldives to the United Nations and Ambassador of the Maldives to the United States and Canada from July 2017 to May 2019.

A native of Gaddhoo, Gaafu Dhaalu Atoll, Naseer received a PhD in diplomatic studies from the Australian National University, and a master's degree in diplomatic studies from the University of Leicester. He joined the Maldives Foreign Service in May 1985 and served in a number of posts within the Foreign Ministry, including additional secretary of the Policy Planning Division, director general of the Foreign Relations Directorate, director general of the Department for External Resources, and assistant director of the Research Division. He was the lead figure tasked with coordinating international relief aid in the aftermath of the 2004 Indian Ocean earthquake and tsunami in the Maldives. From November 2013 to July 2017 he was foreign secretary in the Ministry of Foreign Affairs. 

On 9 July 2017 he was appointed by President Abdulla Yameen as ambassador and permanent representative, succeeding Ahmed Sareer, who replaced him as foreign secretary. He took office as Permanent Representative to the United Nations on 17 July 2017 and presented his credentials to U.S. President Donald Trump on 21 July 2017. He was succeeded by Thilmeeza Hussain in May 2019.

Naseer is married to Dr Azeema Adam, a former governor of the Maldives Monetary Authority who resigned in 2017.  They have a daughter and a son.

References 

Maldivian diplomats
Permanent Representatives of the Maldives to the United Nations
Living people
Australian National University alumni
Alumni of the University of Leicester
1969 births
Ambassadors of the Maldives to the United States